The 2014 Atlanta Braves season was the Braves' 18th season of home games at Turner Field, 49th season in Atlanta, and 144th season overall. Before September, the Braves had two winning months and three non-winning months that they played, and briefly reached first place in their division. The team's performance declined in September, as the team lost 16 out of the first 20 games they played that month. They finished tied in 2nd place with a 79–83 record, 17 games back in second place in the division, and failed to make the playoffs.

Season standings

National League East

National League Wild Card Standings

Record vs. opponents

Roster

Game log

|- style="text-align:center; style="background-color:#ffbbbb;"
| 1 || Mar 31 || @ Brewers || 0–2 || Gallardo (1–0) || Teherán (0–1) || Rodríguez (1) || 45,691 || 0–1 || L1
|-

|- style="text-align:center; style="background-color:#bbffbb"
| 2 || Apr 1 || @ Brewers || 5–2 || Wood (1–0) || Lohse (0–1) || Kimbrel (1) || 21,503 || 1–1 || W1
|- style="text-align:center; style="background-color:#bbffbb;"
| 3 || Apr 2 || @ Brewers || 1–0 || Harang (1–0) || Garza (0–1) || Kimbrel (2) || 21,712 || 2–1 || W2
|- style="text-align:center; style="background-color:#bbffbb;"
| 4 || Apr 4 || @ Nationals || 2–1 || Avilán (1–0) || Clippard (0–1) || Kimbrel (3) || 42,834 || 3–1 || W3
|- style="text-align:center; style="background-color:#bbffbb;"
| 5 || Apr 5 || @ Nationals || 6–2 || Teherán (1–1) || Strasburg (0–1) || || 37,841 || 4–1 || W4
|- style="text-align:center; style="background-color:#ffbbbb;"
| 6 || Apr 6 || @ Nationals || 1–2 || Blevins (1–0) || Wood (1–1) || Soriano (1) || 34,327 || 4–2 || L1
|- style="text-align:center; style="background-color:#ffbbbb;"
| 7 || Apr 8 || Mets || 0–4 || Colón (1–1) || Harang (1–1)|| || 47,144 || 4–3 || L2
|- style="text-align:center; style="background-color:#bbffbb"
| 8 || Apr 9 || Mets || 4–3 || Santana (1–0) || Wheeler (0–2) || Kimbrel (4) || 19,608 || 5–3 || W1 
|- style="text-align:center; style="background-color:#ffbbbb;"
| 9 || Apr 10 || Mets || 4–6 || Torres (2–0) || Avilán (1–1) || Valverde (2) || 29,470 || 5–4 || L1
|- style="text-align:center; style="background-color:#bbffbb"
| 10 || Apr 11 || Nationals || 7–6 (10) || Avilán (2–1) || Blevins (1–1) || || 28,243 || 6–4 ||W1
|- style="text-align:center; style="background-color:#bbffbb;"
| 11 || Apr 12 || Nationals || 6–3 || Wood (2–1) || Jordan (0–1) || Kimbrel (5) || 36,621 || 7–4 || W2
|- style="text-align:center; style="background-color:#bbffbb;"
| 12 || Apr 13 || Nationals || 10–2 || Harang (2–1) || Gonzalez (2–1) || || 27,919 || 8–4 || W3
|- style="text-align:center; style="background-color:#bbffbb;"
| 13 || Apr 14 || @ Phillies || 9–6 ||Avilán (3–1) || Diekman (1–1) || Carpenter (1) || 26,516 || 9–4 ||W4
|- style="text-align:center; style="background-color:#bbbbbb;"
|    || Apr 15 || @ Phillies ||colspan=7| PPD, RAIN; rescheduled for June 28
|- style="text-align:center; style="background-color:#bbffbb;"
| 14 || Apr 16 || @ Phillies || 1–0 || Teherán (2–1) || Lee (2–2) || || 23,382 || 10–4 ||W5
|- style="text-align:center; style="background-color:#ffbbbb;"
| 15 || Apr 17 || @ Phillies || 0–1 || Bastardo (2–1) || Wood (2–2) || Papelbon (4) || 25,750 || 10–5 ||L1
|- style="text-align:center; style="background-color:#bbffbb;"
| 16 || Apr 18 || @ Mets || 6–0 || Harang (3–1) || Niese (0–2) || || 33,199 || 11–5 ||W1
|- style="text-align:center; style="background-color:#bbffbb;"
| 17 || Apr 19 || @ Mets || 7–5 || Santana (2–0) || Colón (1–3) || Walden (1) || 31,476 || 12–5 ||W2
|- style="text-align:center; style="background-color:#ffbbbb;"
| 18 || Apr 20 || @ Mets || 3–4 (14) || Valverde (1–0)|| Schlosser (0–1)|| || 33,131 || 12–6 ||L1
|- style="text-align:center; style="background-color:#bbffbb;"
| 19 || Apr 21 || Marlins || 4–2 (10) || Varvaro (1–0) || Caminero (0–1) || || 16,055 || 13–6 ||W1
|- style="text-align:center; style="background-color:#ffbbbb;"
| 20 || Apr 22 || Marlins || 0–1 || Fernández (3–1) || Wood (2–3) || Cishek (4) || 18,275 || 13–7 || L1
|- style="text-align:center; style="background-color:#bbffbb;"
| 21 || Apr 23 || Marlins || 3–1 || Carpenter (1–0) || Dunn (1–3) || Kimbrel (6) || 21,508 || 14–7 || W1
|- style="text-align:center; style="background-color:#bbffbb;"
| 22 || Apr 25 || Reds || 5–4 || Santana (3–0) || Bailey (1–2) || Kimbrel (7) || 31,111 || 15–7 || W2
|- style="text-align:center; style="background-color:#bbffbb;"
| 23 || Apr 26 || Reds || 4–1 || Hale (1–0) || Leake (2–2) || Kimbrel (8) || 33,702 || 16–7 || W3
|- style="text-align:center; style="background-color:#bbffbb;"
| 24 || Apr 27 || Reds || 1–0 (10) || Thomas (1–0) || Hoover (1–3)  || || 31,446 || 17–7 || W4
|- style="text-align:center; style="background-color:#ffbbbb;"
| 25 || Apr 29 || @ Marlins || 0–9 || Fernández (4–1) || Wood (2–4) || || 21,992 || 17–8 || L1
|- style="text-align:center; style="background-color:#ffbbbb;"
| 26 || Apr 30 || @ Marlins || 3–9 || Eovaldi (2–1) || Harang (2–3) || || 15,558 || 17–9 || L2
|-

|- style="text-align:center; style="background-color:#ffbbbb;"
| 27 || May 1 || @ Marlins || 4–5 || Dunn (3–3) || Thomas (1–1) || Cishek (6) || 17,836 || 17–10 || L3
|- style="text-align:center; style="background-color:#ffbbbb;"
| 28 || May 2 || Giants || 1–2 || Lincecum (2–1) || Minor (0–1) || Romo (8) || 29,469 || 17–11 || L4
|- style="text-align:center; style="background-color:#ffbbbb;"
| 29 || May 3 || Giants || 1–3 || Vogelsong (1–1) || Teherán (2–2) || Romo (9) || 34,648 || 17–12 || L5
|- style="text-align:center; style="background-color:#ffbbbb;"
| 30 || May 4 || Giants || 1–4 || Bumgarner (3–3) || Wood (2–5) || Casilla (1) || 30,067 || 17–13 || L6
|- style="text-align:center; style="background-color:#ffbbbb;"
| 31 || May 5 || Cardinals || 3–4 || Miller (4–2) || Harang (3–3) || Rosenthal (9) || 20,048 || 17–14 || L7
|- style="text-align:center; style="background-color:#bbffbb;"
| 32 || May 6 || Cardinals || 2–1 || Carpenter (2–0) || Choate (0–1) || Kimbrel (9) || 18,413 || 18–14 || W1
|- style="text-align:center; style="background-color:#ffbbbb;"
| 33 || May 7 || Cardinals || 1–7 || Wainwright (6–2) || Minor (0–2) || || 21,796 || 18–15 || L1
|- style="text-align:center; style="background-color:#bbffbb;"
| 34 || May 9 || Cubs || 3–2 (10) || Wood (3–5) || Wright (0–1) || || 27,145 || 19–15 || W1
|- style="text-align:center; style="background-color:#bbffbb;"
| 35 || May 10 || Cubs || 2–0 || Santana (4–0) || Schlitter (2–1) || Kimbrel (10) || 30,658 || 20–15 || W2
|- style="text-align:center; style="background-color:#bbffbb;"
| 36 || May 11 || Cubs || 5–2 || Harang (4–3) || Jackson (2–3) || Carpenter (2) || 26,151 || 21–15 || W3
|- style="text-align:center; style="background-color:#ffbbbb;"
| 37 || May 12 || @ Giants || 2–4 || Lincecum (3–2) || Floyd (0–1) || Romo (13) || 41,438 || 21–16 || L1
|- style="text-align:center; style="background-color:#bbffbb;"
| 38 || May 13 || @ Giants || 5–0 || Minor (1–2) || Vogelsong (1–2) || || 41,506 || 22–16 || W1
|- style="text-align:center; style="background-color:#ffbbbb;"
| 39 || May 14 || @ Giants || 4–10 || Bumgarner (5–3) || Teherán (2–3) || || 41,253 || 22–17 || L1
|- style="text-align:center; style="background-color:#ffbbbb;"
| 40 || May 16 || @ Cardinals || 2–5 || Lynn (5–2) || Santana (4–1) || Rosenthal (12) || 43,701 || 22–18 || L2
|- style="text-align:center; style="background-color:#ffbbbb;"
| 41 || May 17 || @ Cardinals || 1–4 || Miller (6–2) || Harang (4–4) || Rosenthal (13) || 44,981 || 22–19 || L3
|- style="text-align:center; style="background-color:#bbffbb;"
| 42 || May 18 || @ Cardinals || 6–5 || Carpenter (3–0) || Rosenthal (0–2) || Kimbrel (11) || 44,278 || 23–19 || W1
|- style="text-align:center; style="background-color:#bbffbb;"
| 43 || May 19 || Brewers || 9–3 || Minor (2–2) || Peralta (4–3) || || 20,468 || 24–19 || W2
|- style="text-align:center; style="background-color:#bbffbb;"
| 44 || May 20 || Brewers || 5–0 || Teherán (3–3) || Gallardo (2–3) || || 20,045 || 25–19 ||  W3
|- style="text-align:center; style="background-color:#ffbbbb;"
| 45 || May 21 || Brewers || 1–6 || Lohse (6–1) || Santana (4–2) || || 18,148 || 25–20 ||  L1
|- style="text-align:center; style="background-color:#bbffbb;"
| 46 || May 22 || Brewers || 5–4 || Wood (4–5) || Kintzler (1–2) ||  Kimbrel (12) || 30,148 || 26–20 || W1
|- style="text-align:center; style="background-color:#bbffbb;"
| 47 || May 23 || Rockies || 3–2 || Carpenter (4–0) || Ottavino (0–1)  || Kimbrel (13) || 25,646 || 27-20|| W2 
|- style="text-align:center; style="background-color:#ffbbbb;"
| 48 || May 24 || Rockies || 1–3 || Nicasio (5–2) || Minor (2–3) || Hawkins (11) || 26,741 || 27-21 || L1 
|- style="text-align:center; style="background-color:#bbffbb;"
| 49 || May 25 || Rockies || 7–0 || Teherán (4–3) || Morales (3–4) || || 35,565 || 28-21 || W1 
|- style="text-align:center; style="background-color:#ffbbbb;"
| 50 || May 26 || Red Sox || 6–8 || Mujica (2–1) || Thomas (1–2) || Uehara (10)  || 48,501 || 28–22 || L1
|- style="text-align:center; style="background-color:#ffbbbb;"
| 51 || May 27 || Red Sox || 3–6 || Lester (5–6) || Varvaro (1–1) || Uehara (11)  || 37,168 || 28-23 || L2 
|- style="text-align:center; style="background-color:#ffbbbb;"
| 52 || May 28 || @ Red Sox || 0–4 || Lackey (6–3)||Floyd (0–2) ||  ||36,189 || 28-24 ||L3
|- style="text-align:center; style="background-color:#ffbbbb;"
| 53 || May 29 || @ Red Sox || 3–4 || Uehara (1–1) || Kimbrel (0–1) || || 36,292 || 28-25 || L4 
|- style="text-align:center; style="background-color:#bbffbb;"
| 54 || May 30 || @ Marlins || 3-2 || Teherán (5–3) || Koehler (4–5) || Kimbrel (14) || 18,469 || 29-25 || W1 
|- style="text-align:center; style="background-color:#bbffbb;"
| 55 || May 31 || @ Marlins || 9-5 || Santana (5–2) || Turner (1–3) || Kimbrel (15) || 26,875 || 30-25 ||W2
|-

|- style="text-align:center; style="background-color:#bbffbb;"
| 56 || June 1 || @ Marlins || 4–2 || Wood (6–5) || Cishek (4–2) || Simmons (1) || 21,997 || 31–25 || W3
|- style="text-align:center; style="background-color:#ffbbbb;"
| 57 || June 3 || Mariners || 5–7 ||  Leone (2–0) || Wood (6–6) || Rodney (15) || 36,503 || 31–26|| L1
|- style="text-align:center; style="background-color:#ffbbbb;"
| 58 || June 4 || Mariners || 0–2 || Iwakuma (4–2) || Minor (2–4) || Rodney (16) || 26,960 || 31–27 || L2
|- style="text-align:center; style="background-color:#bbffbb;"
| 59 || June 6 || @ Diamondbacks || 5–2 || Teherán (6–3) || McCarthy (1–8) || Kimbrel (16) || 24,504 || 32–27 || W1
|- style="text-align:center; style="background-color:#ffbbbb;"
| 60 || June 7 || @ Diamondbacks || 3–4 (11) || Delgado (1–1) || Carpenter (4–1) || || 29,278 || 32–28 || L1
|- style="text-align:center; style="background-color:#ffbbbb;"
| 61 || June 8 || @ Diamondbacks || 5–6 || Anderson (5–0) || Harang (4–5) || Ziegler (1) || 26,534 || 32–29 || L2
|- style="text-align:center; style="background-color:#bbffbb;"
| 62 || June 9 || @ Rockies || 3–1 || Floyd (1–2) || Bergman (0–1) || Kimbrel (17) || 28,817 || 33–29 || W1 
|- style="text-align:center; style="background-color:#bbffbb;"
| 63 || June 10 || @ Rockies || 13–10 || Hale (2–0) || Nicasio (5–5) || Kimbrel (18) ||  27,875 || 34–29 || W2
|- style="text-align:center; style="background-color:#ffbbbb;"
| 64 || June 11 || @ Rockies || 2–8 || Matzek (1–0) || Teherán (6–4) || || 29,112 || 34–30 || L1
|- style="text-align:center; style="background-color:#ffbbbb;"
| 65 || June 12 || @ Rockies || 3–10 || Chacín (1–4) || Santana (5–3) || || 33,648 || 34–31 || L2
|- style="text-align:center; style="background-color:#bbffbb;"
| 66 || June 13 || Angels || 4–3 || Harang (5–5) || Wilson (7–6) || Kimbrel (19) || 39,699 || 35–31 || W1
|- style="text-align:center; style="background-color:#ffbbbb;"
| 67 || June 14 || Angels || 6–11 (13) || Salas (4–0) || Hale (2–1) || || 48,559 || 35–32 || L1
|- style="text-align:center; style="background-color:#bbffbb;"
| 68 || June 15 || Angels || 7–3 || Varvaro (2–1) || Santiago (0–7) || Kimbrel (20) || 29,320 || 36–32 || W1
|- style="text-align:center; style="background-color:#ffbbbb;"
| 69 || June 16 || Phillies || 1–6 (13) || Bastardo (4–3) || Hale (2–2) || || 23,900 || 36–33 || L1
|- style="text-align:center; style="background-color:#ffbbbb;"
| 70 || June 17 || Phillies || 2–5 || Kendrick (3–6) || Santana (5–4) || Papelbon (16) || 41,631 || 36–34 || L2
|- style="text-align:center; style="background-color:#ffbbbb;"
| 71 || June 18 || Phillies || 5–10 || Hernández (3–5) || Harang (5–6) || || 28,500 || 36–35 || L3
|- style="text-align:center; style="background-color:#bbffbb;"
| 72 || June 19 || @ Nationals || 3–0 || Floyd (2–2) || Zimmermann (5–4) || Kimbrel (21) || 32,193 || 37–35 || W1
|- style="text-align:center; style="background-color:#bbffbb;"
| 73 || June 20 || @ Nationals || 6–4 (13) || Buchter (1–0) || Blevins (2–3) || Walden (2) || 36,608 || 38–35 || W2
|- style="text-align:center; style="background-color:#ffbbbb;"
| 74 || June 21 || @ Nationals || 0–3 || Fister (6–2) || Teherán (6–5) || Soriano (16) || 40,677 || 38–36 || L1
|- style="text-align:center; style="background-color:#ffbbbb;"
| 75 || June 22 || @ Nationals || 1–4 || Roark (6–4) || Santana (5–5) || Soriano (17) || 39,473 || 38–37 || L2
|- style="text-align:center; style="background-color:#bbffbb;"
| 76 || June 24 || @ Astros || 3–2 || Harang (6–6) || Feldman (3–5) || Kimbrel (22) || 18,912 || 39–37 || W1
|- style="text-align:center; style="background-color:#bbffbb;"
| 77 || June 25 || @ Astros || 4–0 || Wood (6–6) || McHugh (4–6) || || 20,559 || 40–37 || W2
|- style="text-align:center; style="background-color:#ffbbbb;"
| 78 || June 26 || @ Astros || 1–6 || Cosart (8–5) || Minor (2–5) || || 24,474 || 40–38 || L1
|- style="text-align:center; style="background-color:#bbffbb;"
| 79 || June 27 || @ Phillies || 4–2 || Teherán (7–5) || Kendrick (3–8) || Kimbrel (23) || 38,100 || 41–38 || W1
|- style="text-align:center; style="background-color:#bbffbb;"
| 80 || June 28 || @ Phillies || 10–3 || Santana (6–5) || Hernández (3–7) || || 28,845 || 42–38 || W2
|- style="text-align:center; style="background-color:#bbffbb;"
| 81 || June 28 || @ Phillies || 5–1 || Hale (3–2) || O'Sullivan (0–1) || || 30,845 || 43–38 || W3
|- style="text-align:center; style="background-color:#bbffbb;"
| 82 || June 29 || @ Phillies || 3–2 || Harang (7–6) || Buchanan (4–4) || Kimbrel (24) || 33,215 || 44–38 ||  W4
|- style="text-align:center; style="background-color:#bbffbb;"
| 83 || June 30 || Mets || 5–3 || Varvaro (3–1) || Familia (1–3) || Kimbrel (25) || 28,075 || 45–38 || W5
|-

|- style="text-align:center; style="background-color:#bbffbb;"
| 84 || July 1 || Mets || 5–4 || Simmons (1–0) || Matsuzaka (3–3) || Kimbrel (26) || 21,347 || 46–38 || W6
|- style="text-align:center; style="background-color:#bbffbb;"
| 85 || July 2 || Mets || 3–1 || Teherán (8–5) || deGrom (1–5) || Walden (3) || 23,601 || 47–38 || W7
|- style="text-align:center; style="background-color:#bbffbb;"
| 86 || July 4 || Diamondbacks || 5–2 || Santana (7–5) || Collmenter (7–5) || Kimbrel (27) || 48,815 || 48–38 || W8
|- style="text-align:center; style="background-color:#bbffbb;"
| 87 || July 5 || Diamondbacks || 10–4 || Harang (8–6) || Bolsinger (1–5) || || 30,405 || 49–38 || W9
|- style="text-align:center; style="background-color:#ffbbbb;"
| 88 || July 6 || Diamondbacks || 1–3 || Miley (4–6) || Wood (6–7) || Reed (20) || 23,709 || 49–39 || L1
|- style="text-align:center; style="background-color:#ffbbbb;"
| 89 || July 7 || @ Mets || 3–4 (11) || Torres (4–4) || Varvaro (3–2) ||  || 20,836 || 49–40 || L2
|- style="text-align:center; style="background-color:#ffbbbb;"
| 90 || July 8 || @ Mets || 3–8 || deGrom (2–5)  || Teherán (8–6) ||  || 20,671 || 49–41 || L3
|- style="text-align:center; style="background-color:#ffbbbb;"
| 91 || July 9 || @ Mets || 1–4 || Gee (4–1) || Santana (7–6) || Mejía (9) || 21,327 || 49–42 || L4
|- style="text-align:center; style="background-color:#bbffbb;"
| 92 || July 10 || @ Mets || 3–1 || Harang (9–6) || Colón (8–8) || Kimbrel (28) || 23,528 || 50–42 || W1
|- style="text-align:center; style="background-color:#ffbbbb;"
| 93 || July 11 || @ Cubs || 4–5 || Rondón (2–3) || Walden (0–1) || || 39,544 || 50–43 || L1
|- style="text-align:center; style="background-color:#bbffbb;"
| 94 || July 12 || @ Cubs || 11–6 || Minor (3–5) || Jackson (5–10) || Carpenter (3) || 36,806 || 51–43 || W1
|- style="text-align:center; style="background-color:#bbffbb;"
| 95 || July 13 || @ Cubs || 10–7 || Teherán (9–6) || Wood (7–8) || Kimbrel (29) || 36,363 || 52–43 || W2
|-  style="text-align:center; bgcolor="bbcaff"
| || July 15 || All-Star Game || NL 3–5 AL || Scherzer || Neshek || Perkins || 41,048 ||colspan="2" | Target Field
|- style="text-align:center; style="background-color:#bbffbb;"
| 96 || July 18 || Phillies || 6–4 || Santana (8–6) || Burnett (6–9) || Kimbrel (30) || 39,747 || 53–43 || W3
|- style="text-align:center; style="background-color:#ffbbbb;"
| 97 || July 19 || Phillies || 1–2 || Hamels (4–5) || Simmons (1–1) || Papelbon (23) || 38,602 || 53–44 || L1
|- style="text-align:center; style="background-color:#bbffbb;"
| 98 || July 20 || Phillies || 8–2 || Wood (7–7) || Kendrick (4–10) || || 24,859 || 54–44 || W1
|- style="text-align:center; style="background-color:#ffbbbb;"
| 99 || July 21 || Marlins || 1–3 (10) || Morris (7–0) || Simmons (1–2) || Cishek (22) || 26,766 || 54–45 || L1
|- style="text-align:center; style="background-color:#ffbbbb;"
| 100 || July 22 || Marlins || 5–6 || Turner (3–6) || Minor (3–6) || Cishek (23) || 22,998 || 54–46 || L2
|- style="text-align:center; style="background-color:#bbffbb;"
| 101 || July 23 || Marlins || 6–1 || Santana (9–6) || Eovaldi (5–6) || || 20,102 || 55–46 || W1
|- style="text-align:center; style="background-color:#ffbbbb;"
| 102 || July 24 || Marlins || 2–3 || Álvarez (7–5) || Kimbrel (0–2) || Cishek (24) || 26,446 || 55–47 || L1
|- style="text-align:center; style="background-color:#ffbbbb;"
| 103 || July 25 || Padres || 2–5 || Hahn (6–2) || Wood (7–8) || Benoit (2) || 31,647 || 55–48 || L2
|- style="text-align:center; style="background-color:#bbffbb;"
| 104 || July 26 || Padres || 5–3 || Teherán (10–6) || Despaigne (2–2) || Kimbrel (31) || 33,820 || 56–48 || W1
|- style="text-align:center; style="background-color:#bbffbb;"
| 105 || July 27 || Padres || 8–3 || Minor (4–6) || Stults (3–13) || || 31,456 || 57–48 || W2
|- style="text-align:center; style="background-color:#bbffbb;"
| 106 || July 28 || Padres || 2–0 || Santana (10–6) || Lane (0–1) || Kimbrel (32) || 23,281 || 58–48 || W3
|- style="text-align:center; style="background-color:#ffbbbb;"
| 107 || July 29 || @ Dodgers || 4–8 || League (2–2) || Varvaro (3–3) || Jansen (31) || 49,630 || 58–49 || L1
|- style="text-align:center; style="background-color:#ffbbbb;"
| 108 || July 30 || @ Dodgers || 2–3 (10) || Howell (3–3) || Hale (3–3) || || 47,386 || 58–50 || L2
|- style="text-align:center; style="background-color:#ffbbbb;"
| 109 || July 31 || @ Dodgers || 1–2 || Kershaw (13–2) || Teherán (10–7) || || 51,163 || 58–51 || L3
|-

|- style="text-align:center; style="background-color:#ffbbbb;"
| 110 || August 1 || @ Padres || 1–10 || Stults (4–13) || Minor (4–7) || || 33,779 || 58–52 || L4
|- style="text-align:center; style="background-color:#ffbbbb;"
| 111 || August 2 || @ Padres || 2–3 (12) || Stauffer (3–2) || Kimbrel (0–3) || || 39,402 || 58–53 || L5 
|- style="text-align:center; style="background-color:#ffbbbb;"
| 112 || August 3 || @ Padres || 3–4 (10) || Stauffer (4–2) || Hale (3–4) || || 30,861 || 58–54 || L6 
|- style="text-align:center; style="background-color:#ffbbbb;"
| 113 || August 5 || @ Mariners || 2–4 || Hernández (12–3) || Wood (7–9) || Rodney (31) || 24,496 || 58–55 || L7
|- style="text-align:center; style="background-color:#ffbbbb;"
| 114 || August 6 || @ Mariners || 3–7 || Young (10–6) || Teherán (10–8) || || 30,770 || 58–56 || L8
|- style="text-align:center; style="background-color:#bbffbb;"
| 115 || August 8 || Nationals || 7–6 || Santana (11–6) || Strasburg (8–10) || Kimbrel (33) || 32,707 || 59–56 || W1
|- style="text-align:center; style="background-color:#ffbbbb;"
| 116 || August 9 || Nationals || 1–4 (11) || Clippard (7–2) || Carpenter (4–2) || Soriano (26) || 36,832 || 59–57 || L1
|- style="text-align:center; style="background-color:#bbffbb;"
| 117 || August 10 || Nationals || 3–1 || Wood (8–9) || Gonzalez (6–9) || Kimbrel (34) || 18,191 || 60–57 || W1
|- style="text-align:center; style="background-color:#ffbbbb;"
| 118 || August 11 || Dodgers || 2–6 || Correia (6–13) || Teherán (10–9) || || 20,052 || 60–58 || L1
|- style="text-align:center; style="background-color:#ffbbbb;"
| 119 || August 12 || Dodgers || 2–4 || Haren (10–9) || Minor (4–8) || Jansen (33) || 31,904 || 60–59 || L2
|- style="text-align:center; style="background-color:#bbffbb;"
| 120 || August 13 || Dodgers || 3–2 || Santana (12–6) || Ryu (13–6) || Kimbrel (35) || 33,299 || 61–59 || W1
|- style="text-align:center; style="background-color:#ffbbbb;"
| 121 || August 14 || Dodgers || 4–6 || Hernández (7–8) || Harang (9–7) || Jansen (34) || 19,347 || 61–60 || L1
|- style="text-align:center; style="background-color:#bbffbb;"
| 122 || August 15 || Athletics || 7–2 || Wood (9–9) || Hammel (9–10) || || 30,606 || 62–60 || W1
|- style="text-align:center; style="background-color:#bbffbb;"
| 123 || August 16 || Athletics || 4–3 || Teherán (11–9) || Gray (12–7) || Kimbrel (36) || 40,760 || 63–60 || W2
|- style="text-align:center; style="background-color:#bbffbb;"
| 124 || August 17 || Athletics || 4–3 || Minor (5–8) || Lester (13–8) || Kimbrel (37) || 25,461 || 64–60 || W3
|- style="text-align:center; style="background-color:#bbffbb;"
| 125 || August 18 || @ Pirates || 7–3 || Santana (13–6) || Worley (5–3) || || 31,669 || 65–60 || W4
|- style="text-align:center; style="background-color:#bbffbb;"
| 126 || August 19 || @ Pirates || 11–3 || Harang (10–7) || Liriano (3–10) || || 27,033 || 66–60 || W5
|- style="text-align:center; style="background-color:#ffbbbb;"
| 127 || August 20 || @ Pirates || 2–3 || Melancon (2–3) || Carpenter (4–3) || || 26,581 || 66–61 || L1
|- style="text-align:center; style="background-color:#bbffbb;"
| 128 || August 21 || @ Reds || 8–0 || Teherán (12–9) || Holmberg (0–1) || || 20,243 || 67–61 || W1
|- style="text-align:center; style="background-color:#bbffbb;"
| 129 || August 22 || @ Reds || 3–1 (12) || Hale (4–4) || Parra (0–1) || Kimbrel (38) || 31,160 || 68–61 || W2
|- style="text-align:center; style="background-color:#ffbbbb;"
| 130 || August 23 || @ Reds || 0–1 || Leake (10–11) || Santana (13–7) || Chapman (27) || 41,502 || 68–62 || L1
|- style="text-align:center; style="background-color:#ffbbbb;"
| 131 || August 24 || @ Reds || 3–5 || Simón (13–8) || Harang (10–8) || Broxton (8) || 29,422 || 68–63 || L2
|- style="text-align:center; style="background-color:#ffbbbb;"
| 132 || August 26 || @ Mets || 2–3 || Gee (5–6) || Wood (9–10) || Mejía (19) || 22,406 || 68–64 || L3
|- style="text-align:center; style="background-color:#bbffbb;"
| 133 || August 27 || @ Mets || 3–2 || Teherán (13–9) || Wheeler (9–9) || Kimbrel (39) || 22,014 || 69–64 || W1
|- style="text-align:center; style="background-color:#bbffbb;"
| 134 || August 28 || @ Mets || 6–1 || Minor (6–8) || Niese (7–10) || || 22,154 || 70–64 || W2
|- style="text-align:center; style="background-color:#bbffbb;"
| 135 || August 29 || Marlins || 5–2 || Carpenter (5–3) || Hatcher (0–2) || Kimbrel (40) || 26,278 || 71–64 || W3 
|- style="text-align:center; style="background-color:#ffbbbb;"
| 136 || August 30 || Marlins || 0–4 || Cosart (3–1) || Harang (10–9) || || 25,335 || 71–65 || L1
|- style="text-align:center; style="background-color:#bbffbb;"
| 137 || August 31 || Marlins || 1–0 || Wood (10–10) || Eovaldi (6–10) || Kimbrel (41) || 45,754 || 72–65 || W1
|-

|- style="text-align:center; style="background-color:#ffbbbb;"
| 138 || September 1 || Phillies || 0–7 || Hamels (8–6) || Teherán (13–10) || || 34,178 || 72–66 || L1
|- style="text-align:center; style="background-color:#ffbbbb;"
| 139 || September 2 || Phillies || 0–4 || Kendrick (8–11) || Minor (6–9) || || 19,444 || 72–67 || L2
|- style="text-align:center; style="background-color:#bbffbb;"
| 140 || September 3 || Phillies || 7–4 || Santana (14–7) || Hollands (1–1) || Kimbrel (42) || 19,724 || 73–67 || W1
|- style="text-align:center; style="background-color:#ffbbbb;"
| 141 || September 5 || @ Marlins || 3–11 || Cosart (13–8) || Harang (10–10) || || 19,951 || 73–68 || L1
|- style="text-align:center; style="background-color:#bbffbb;"
| 142 || September 6 || @ Marlins || 4–3 (10) || Carpenter (6–3) || Morris (6–1) || Kimbrel (43) || 25,485 || 74–68 || W1
|- style="text-align:center; style="background-color:#ffbbbb;"
| 143 || September 7 || @ Marlins || 0–4 || Hand (3–6) || Teherán (13–11) || || 20,013 || 74–69 || L1
|- style="text-align:center; style="background-color:#ffbbbb;"
| 144 || September 8 || @ Nationals || 1–2 || Fister (13–6) || Minor (6–10) || Storen (3) || 25,448 || 74–70 || L2
|- style="text-align:center; style="background-color:#ffbbbb;"
| 145 || September 9 || @ Nationals || 4–6 || Zimmermann (11–5) || Santana (14-8) || Storen (4) || 29,233 || 74–71 || L3
|- style="text-align:center; style="background-color:#bbffbb;"
| 146 || September 10 || @ Nationals || 6–2 ||  Harang (11–10) || Strasburg (11-11) || || 31,086 || 75–71 || W1
|- style="text-align:center; style="background-color:#ffbbbb;"
| 147 || September 12 || @ Rangers || 1–2 || Klein (1–2) || Carpenter (6–4) || Feliz (9) || 27,547 || 75–72 || L1
|- style="text-align:center; style="background-color:#ffbbbb;"
| 148 || September 13 || @ Rangers || 2–3 || Bonilla (1–0) || Teherán (13–12) || Cotts (1) || 31,595 || 75–73 || L2
|- style="text-align:center; style="background-color:#ffbbbb;"
| 149 || September 14 || @ Rangers || 3–10 || Lewis (10–13) || Minor (6–11) || || 25,449 || 75–74 || L3
|- style="text-align:center; style="background-color:#ffbbbb;"
| 150 || September 15 || Nationals  || 2–4 ||  Strasburg (12–11) || Santana (14-9) || Storen (6) || 18,220  || 75–75 || L4
|- style="text-align:center; style="background-color:#ffbbbb;"
| 151 || September 16 || Nationals || 0–3 ||  Roark (14–10) || Harang (11-11) || Storen (7) || 28,175 || 75–76 || L5
|- style="text-align:center; style="background-color:#bbffbb;"
| 152 || September 17 || Nationals || 3–1 ||  Wood (11–10) || Detwiler (2–3) || Kimbrel (44) || 26,643 || 76–76 || W1
|- style="text-align:center; style="background-color:#ffbbbb;"
| 153 || September 19 || Mets || 0–5 || Wheeler (11–10) || Teherán (13–13) || || 35,693 || 76–77 || L1
|- style="text-align:center; style="background-color:#ffbbbb;"
| 154 || September 20 || Mets || 2–4 || Niese (9–11) || Minor (6–12) || Mejía (27) || 33,794 || 76–78 || L2
|- style="text-align:center; style="background-color:#ffbbbb;"
| 155 || September 21 || Mets || 2–10 || deGrom (9–6) || Santana (14–10) || || 35,354 || 76–79 || L3
|- style="text-align:center; style="background-color:#ffbbbb;"
| 156 || September 22 || Pirates || 0–1 || Liriano (7-10) || Harang (11-12)  || Melancon (32) || 20,252 || 76-80 || L4
|- style="text-align:center; style="background-color:#ffbbbb;"
| 157 || September 23 || Pirates || 2–3 || Cole (11-5) || Wood (11–11)  || Watson (2) || 23,029 || 76-81 || L5
|- style="text-align:center; style="background-color:#bbffbb;"
| 158 || September 24 || Pirates || 6-2 || Teherán (14-13) || Locke (7-6) || || 25,457 || 77-81 || W1
|- style="text-align:center; style="background-color:#ffbbbb;"
| 159 || September 25 || Pirates || 1-10 || Volquez (13-7) || Hale (4-5) || || 35,140 || 77-82 || L1
|- style="text-align:center; style="background-color:#ffbbbb;"
| 160 || September 26 || @ Phillies || 4-5 || García (1-0) || Walden (0-2) || Papelbon (39) || 33,121 || 77-83 || L2
|- style="text-align:center; style="background-color:#bbffbb;"
| 161 || September 27 || @ Phillies || 4-2 || Harang (12-12) || Burnett (8-18) || Kimbrel (46) || 33,761 || 78-83 || W1
|- style="text-align:center; style="background-color:#bbffbb;"
| 162 || September 28 || @ Phillies || 2-1 || Avilán (4-1) || Hamels (9-9) || Kimbrel (47) || 38,082 || 79-83 || W2
|-

Farm system

References

External links

2014 Atlanta Braves season at Baseball Reference
2014 Atlanta Braves season Official Site

Atlanta Braves seasons
Atlanta Braves
2014 in sports in Georgia (U.S. state)